Federal Route 1265 (formerly Negeri Sembilan state route N1) is a federal road in Negeri Sembilan, Malaysia.

At most sections, the Federal Route 1265 was built under the JKR R5 road standard, allowing maximum speed limit of up to 90 km/h.

List of junctions

Malaysian Federal Roads